Huaxiang may refer to the following locations in China:

 Huaxiang Road Subdistrict (花亭路街道), Daguan District, Anqing, Anhui
 Huaxiang Township, Beijing (花乡乡), in Fengtai District
 Huaxiang Township, Donglan County (花香乡), Guangxi
 Huaxiang Town, Linwu County (香花镇), Hunan

 may also refer to:

 Huaxiang tea, a variety of insect tea